Stalin and Voroshilov in the Kremlin is a 1938 painting by Soviet painter Aleksandr Gerasimov. It depicts Soviet leaders Joseph Stalin and Kliment Voroshilov walking near the Moscow Kremlin. Since 1941 it is in the exposition of the Tretyakov Gallery in Moscow.

In the Stalinist era its replicas were very widespread, its copies being made for government institutions. Jan Plamper, a German professor studying Russian history, calls it an important sample of socialist realism and cult of personality in the art.

References

Literature
 
 

1938 paintings
Collections of the Tretyakov Gallery
Group portraits
Moscow in fiction
Paintings by Aleksandr Gerasimov
Socialist realism
Soviet paintings
Works about Joseph Stalin